Andrei Viktorovich Shorets was the chairman of the City Executive Committee of Minsk, the capital and largest city of the Republic of Belarus.

References

External links
Major Executives of Minsk City Executive Committee

Living people
Year of birth missing (living people)
Place of birth missing (living people)
Mayors of Minsk